Wamas Chakra (Quechua chakra field, Hispanicized spelling Huamaschacra) is a  mountain in the Cordillera Blanca in the Andes of Peru. It is located in the Ancash Region, Recuay Province, Catac District. It lies in the Qiwllarahu massif.

References

Mountains of Peru
Mountains of Ancash Region